Frederick Ried Roos (born May 22, 1934) is an American film producer.

Biography
Fred Roos was born on May 22, 1934, in Santa Monica, California, the son of Florence Mary (née Stout) and Victor Otto Roos. He attended Hollywood High School and subsequently attended University of California, Los Angeles, majoring in theatre arts and motion pictures. 

He started his career in television as a casting director for The Andy Griffith Show. Later, he produced most of Francis Ford Coppola's films subsequent to The Godfather, including Apocalypse Now and Youth Without Youth. Roos won the Oscar for Best Film for producing The Godfather Part II.

In 2007, he was a member of the jury at the 29th Moscow International Film Festival.

Filmography
As producer (including co-producer and executive producer):
 The Conversation (1974)
 The Godfather Part II (1974)
 Apocalypse Now (1979)
 The Black Stallion (1979)
 One from the Heart (1982)
 The Outsiders (1983)
 Rumble Fish (1983)
 The Cotton Club (1984)
 Barfly (1987)
 The Godfather Part III (1990)
 Radioland Murders (1994)
 The Virgin Suicides (1999)
 Lost in Translation (2003)
 Marie Antoinette (2006)
 The Story of Luke (2012)
 St. Vincent (2014)
 Benched (2018)
 Wonderwell (2018)
 Music, War and Love (2019)
 5-25-77 (2022)

As casting director
Five Easy Pieces (1970)
Two-Lane Blacktop (1971)
The Godfather (1972)
The King of Marvin Gardens (1972)
American Graffiti (1973)

References

External links

Living people
1934 births
People from Santa Monica, California
American film producers
Film producers from California
Producers who won the Best Picture Academy Award
Hollywood High School alumni
University of California, Los Angeles alumni